The 2009 Conference USA men's soccer tournament was the fifteenth edition of the Conference USA Men's Soccer Tournament. The tournament decided the Conference USA champion and guaranteed representative into the 2009 NCAA Division I Men's Soccer Championship. The tournament was hosted by the University of Tulsa and the games were played at the Hurricane Soccer & Track Stadium.

Bracket

Schedule

Semifinals

Final

Statistics

Goalscorers

Awards

All-Tournament team
George Davis IV, Kentucky
Dan Williams, Kentucky
Dustin Dawes, Marshall
Tom Jackson, Marshall
Devin Perkins, Marshall
Andy Aguilar, Tulsa
Ashley McInnes, Tulsa
Austin Neil, Tulsa
Chris Taylor, Tulsa
Two-Boys Gumede, UAB
Carl Woszczynski, UAB

References

External links
 

Conference USA Men's Soccer Tournament
Tournament
Conference USA Men's Soccer Tournament
Conference USA Men's Soccer Tournament